Wang Lei (born 24 January 1995) is a Chinese footballer who currently plays for Chinese club Zhuhai Qin'ao.

Club career
Wang Lei would start his professional career with lower league side Chengdu Qbao and Shanghai JuJu Sports. He would move abroad to Serbia where he played for Temnic 1924 and Mladost Lučani. He would return to China to join Guizhou Hengfeng where he initially joined their reserve team. He would make his competitive debut for the club in a league game on 27 April 2019 against Heilongjiang Lava Spring F.C. where he came on as a substitute in a 2–1 defeat.

Career statistics

References

External links

1995 births
Living people
Chinese footballers
Chinese expatriate footballers
Association football defenders
China League One players
China League Two players
Chengdu Better City F.C. players
Dalian Shide F.C. players
FK Mladost Lučani players
Guizhou F.C. players
Chinese expatriate sportspeople in Serbia
Expatriate footballers in Serbia